"Whitecaps" is the 52nd episode of the HBO television series The Sopranos, and the 13th and final episode of the show's fourth season. Written by the series creator/executive producer David Chase, and executive producers Robin Green, and Mitchell Burgess, it was directed by longtime series director John Patterson and originally aired in the United States on December 8, 2002. The episode attracted 12.5 million viewers and is regarded by many critics as one of the series' best.

Starring
James Gandolfini as Tony Soprano
Lorraine Bracco as Dr. Jennifer Melfi
Edie Falco as Carmela Soprano
Michael Imperioli as Christopher Moltisanti
Dominic Chianese as Corrado Soprano Jr.
Steven Van Zandt as Silvio Dante
Tony Sirico as Paulie Gualtieri
Robert Iler as Anthony Soprano Jr.
Jamie-Lynn Sigler as Meadow Soprano
Drea de Matteo as Adriana La Cerva
Aida Turturro as Janice Soprano
John Ventimiglia as Artie Bucco
 Vincent Curatola as Johnny Sack
Steven R. Schirripa as Bobby Baccalieri

Guest starring

Synopsis
With the Esplanade project shut down, Johnny is worried about his lost revenue. Tony declines to move against Carmine, but when Johnny offers generous concessions, he consents. Christopher returns from rehab in very good shape. Tony asks him to deal with Carmine and make it look like "an outside job"; Christopher pays two heroin dealers and delivers instructions for the hit. However, Carmine unexpectedly changes his mind and offers to negotiate: he agrees to accept just 15% while praising Little Carmine for his role in the negotiations. Though Johnny still intends to go through with the hit, Tony decides against it and orders Christopher to silence the hired guns. When Tony and Johnny meet again, Johnny expresses his resentment and anger at Tony for backing out of their agreement.

Thanks to juror intimidation, Junior is freed following a mistrial. As Bobby and Janice celebrate, Junior, distrusting Janice, finds a pretext to stop them.

Tony takes Carmela on a surprise trip to "Whitecaps," a house on the Jersey Shore he is thinking of buying. At first hesitant, Carmela is eventually delighted; she and Tony walk on the beach and kiss. Tony meets the house's owner, Alan Sapinsly, an attorney, and offers cash in the shortest possible time allowed by law. Sapinsly calls the current buyer, who is having difficulty obtaining a mortgage, and threatens and negotiates his way out of their contract.

Irina drunk dials Carmela, brags about Tony's relations with her, and tells her he also had sex with Svetlana. This causes Carmela extreme distress and when Tony returns home she is hurling his possessions from an upstairs window. She tells Tony that he has embarrassed her for years with his infidelity and tells him to leave the house, while Tony retorts that she stole from him by taking the cash hidden in the birdseed. He goes to Irina's home and finds Svetlana, who explains that soon after Tony humiliated Zellman in front of Irina, their relationship ended. Tony spends the night at Whitecaps and explains to Sapinsly that he no longer wishes to buy the house, but Sapinsly declines to release him from the contract.

Meadow argues with her mother about the separation, asking her how she could "eat shit" from Tony for so many years. Tony returns home and becomes violent when Carmela tells him to leave; she threatens to call a lawyer and get a restraining order. A.J. helps Tony clear the home theater so that he can stay there.

As Tony lies in the pool, Carmela confronts him about a minor annoyance, leading to another argument where she finally reveals her feelings for Furio. Tony, at first incredulous, again becomes violent and almost hits her, but stops himself and strikes the wall beside her head instead. He tells her he looked for women with different qualities from her in his affairs, but she retorts that he hardly knew most of the women he slept with.

Tony calls Dr. Melfi, but hangs up when she answers. She tries to call him back but his number is blocked. He finally tells the family he has decided to move out completely. He embraces his children.

Sapinsly calls Tony and tells him that he will release him from the sale but will keep the $200,000 deposit. He offers to negotiate, but Tony declines. Benny and Little Paulie take the speakers out of Tony's home theater, install them on Tony's boat, anchor it just offshore from Sapinsly’s house and, at lunchtime, play music very loud. The Sapinslys try to ignore it. At night, as they sit peacefully on the patio, the music starts again.

Deceased
 Credenzo Curtis and Stanley Johnson: shot by Benny Fazio and Peter LaRosa in the Meadowlands to ensure their silence about the canceled Carmine hit.

Title reference
 "Whitecaps" is the name of the property Tony plans to buy for his family.
 Whitecaps also refers to the crest of waves that break into sea foam. Like the choppy waters, Tony and Carmela's marriage has become unstable.

Production
 "Whitecaps" is the longest episode of the series, running 75 minutes.

References to past episodes 
 Tony brings up Carmela's telling him he was going to hell when he was first being examined for an MRI for his collapses (this occurred in the show's pilot episode).

Cultural references
When Johnny Sack and Tony meet at an OfficeMax to discuss potentially assassinating Carmine Lupertazzi, Johnny paraphrases a line from The Beatles' song, "Hey Jude," saying, "I'll take a sad song and make it better."
Johnny Sack intimates that with Carmine's assassination there would be "differences between this and Castellano," in reference to the assassination of New York Gambino Crime Family Boss Paul Castellano by John Gotti, who subsequently became boss in 1986.
When Tony first sees Christopher after the latter's release from rehab, he says, "Hey, Jack Lemmon! How's Lee Remick?" This refers to the film Days of Wine and Roses (1962), which deals with alcoholism and recovery.
While in the pool, Tony responds to Carmela's complaint about the seats being left on the lawn being bad for the grass by quoting the Mulwray's Chinese groundskeeper's line about "very bad for grass" from the film Chinatown.
When fighting with Tony in the pool house, Carmela says angrily, "Who knew? All this time, you really wanted Tracy and Hepburn."
 Johnny Sack says to Tony angrily, "Creeps on this petty pace...", misquoting Shakespeare's Macbeth (Act 5, Scene 5, line 20).
When explaining his decision to call off the hit on Carmine, Tony warns Johnny Sack they need to avoid causing a "shootout at the OK Corral," referencing the infamous 1881 gunfight.

Music 
 "Layla" by Derek and the Dominos is playing in Tony's truck when he runs over his golf clubs in his driveway.
 The song played while Tony and Christopher are at Nuovo Vesuvio is "Oh, What A Night" by The Dells.
 The song playing in the background at the Bada Bing back office is "Camouflage of Righteousness" by Little Steven. Little Steven is Steven Van Zandt, who plays Silvio Dante.
 When Janice and Bobby are dancing in Junior's kitchen, they sing/hum part of Sonny and Cher's "I Got You, Babe."
 The song played over the end credits is "I Love Paris (Vegas)" by Dean Martin. It is followed by the instrumental piece, "I Have Dreamed" from the Rodgers & Hammerstein musical The King and I, performed by Fantastic Strings.

Reception

Critical response
Entertainment Weekly placed "Whitecaps" #3 on their list of the 10 greatest The Sopranos episodes; TIME placed it at #4.

Awards
James Gandolfini won his third Primetime Emmy Award for Outstanding Lead Actor in a Drama Series for his performance in this episode. Gandolfini also won the Screen Actors Guild Award for Outstanding Performance by a Male Actor in a Drama Series for his work in the fourth season as well.
Edie Falco won her third Primetime Emmy Award for Outstanding Lead Actress in a Drama Series for her performance in this episode. For her role as Carmela, she also won the Golden Globe Award for Best Actress – Television Series: Drama, the Screen Actors Guild Award for Outstanding Performance by a Female Actor in a Drama Series, and was the first female winner of the TCA Award for Individual Achievement in Drama, a feat that would later be accomplished by Julianna Margulies as well for The Good Wife in 2010.
Mitchell Burgess, David Chase, and Robin Green won the Primetime Emmy Award for Outstanding Writing for a Drama Series for their work on this episode.
John Patterson won the Directors Guild of America Award for Outstanding Directing – Drama Series for his work on this episode.

References

External links
"Whitecaps"  at HBO

The Sopranos (season 4) episodes
2002 American television episodes
Emmy Award-winning episodes
Television episodes written by David Chase
Television episodes directed by John Patterson (director)